National Secondary Route 223, or just Route 223 (or ) is a National Road Route of Costa Rica, located in the Puntarenas province.

Description
In Puntarenas province the route covers Osa canton (Palmar, Sierpe districts).

References

Highways in Costa Rica